Ruthenium pentacarbonyl is the organoruthenium compound with the formula Ru(CO)5.  It is a colorless, light-sensitive liquid that readily decarbonylates upon standing at room temperature.  It is of academic interest as an intermediate for the synthesis of metal carbonyl complexes.

Preparation
Ru(CO)5 was originally prepared by carbonylation of ruthenium salts in the presence of a reducing agent. A more recent preparation involves photolysis of triruthenium dodecacarbonyl in the presence of carbon monoxide:
Ru3(CO)12  +  3 CO      3 Ru(CO)5
It is characterized by two intense νCO bands in the IR spectrum at 2038 and 2003 cm−1 (hexane solution).

Comparisons of M(CO)5 (M = Fe, Ru, Os)
Whereas Fe(CO)5 is completely robust at room temperature, samples of Ru(CO)5 are typically reddish owing to contamination by Ru3(CO)12.  The conversion is rapid in solution.  Os(CO)5 requires heating to 80 °C to effect conversion to triosmium dodecacarbonyl.

References

Organoruthenium compounds
Carbonyl complexes